The 2009 Asian Baseball Championship is an international baseball competition that was held in Sapporo, Japan from July 27 to August 3, 2009. It was the 25th edition of the tournament and featured teams from China, Chinese Taipei, Indonesia, Japan, Philippines, South Korea, and Thailand.

Qualification Tournament
Eight teams were featured in the qualifying tournament from May 25–30, 2009. In the end Indonesia advanced as the winning team to the B level competition in Narita, Japan.

Pool A

Standings

Game Results

Pool B

Standings

Game Results

Final round

Semi finals

7th place

5th place

3rd place

Final

Narita Round

Standings

Game Results

Final round

Standings

Game Results

Final standings

External links
 IBAF
 Schedule (Japanese)

References

Asian Baseball Championship
2009
2009 in Japanese sport
July 2009 sports events in Japan
August 2009 sports events in Japan